This is a list of episodes from the fifth season of Columbo.

Broadcast history

The season originally aired Sundays at 9:00-10:30 pm (EST) as part of The NBC Sunday Mystery Movie.

DVD release
The DVD was released by Universal Studios Home Entertainment.

Episodes

References

Columbo 05
1975 American television seasons
1976 American television seasons